Singamadai Ayyanar Temple is an Aiyanar temple in Nalli, at a distance of 18 km from Sattur in Virudhunagar district in Tamil Nadu (India).

Presiding deity
The presiding deity of the temple is Singamadai Ayyanar. He is flanked by his consorts Purana and Pushkala.

History
Due to drought in this area, 500 years back, a devotee from Srivilliputtur, left his native place. While leaving from his place, he took the sand in leaves where he worshipped the deities such as Aiyanar, Petchi Amman and Karuppayi Amman. While he was nearing Nalli, it started raining. The rain water started entering the field and destroy them. The water from the local lake started to come out and danger was expected, as the water would destroy the place. He tried to control the water which was out of Singamadai lake. Later he put the sand which he was carrying and went to call somebody for help. On return, to his surprise he found, the water stopped coming out from there. The hold sand which he put there saved the place from submerging in water. From there, through a celestial voice Ayyanar said that he saved the land and the field from the rain and asked them if they would construct a temple for him and other parivara deities he would bestow his blessings. The people informed this to the Zamindar of Sevalpatti and he made arrangements and constructed the temple near the lake. As the temple was built nearby Singamadai lake the primary deity was known as Nalli Singamadai Ayyanar.

Other deities
In this temple, Nondi Karuppasamy, Pathinettampadi Karuppasamy, Petchi Amman, Vinayaka, Saptamatas, Nāga, Vairasamy, Nandhi, Veerabadrar, Villadi Karuppasamy, Muthukauppan, Lada Sanyasi, and Valladamuthu are found. Rakkachi, Maadaan, Madathi, Badhala and Kandigai are also found in this temple.

Festival
During Tamil month of Masi, Maha Shivaratri held in grand manner. On the third day of During Maha Shivatri, after getting the   approval of Ayynar Karuppasamy goes on Parivettai. On that day, Ayyanar would be taken in a procession on a carriage around the village.  Karthigai, Maha Shivatri, Panguni Uthiram, Chitra Pournami, Adi Amavasai and on special days, special pujas and festivals are held. During these festivals, devotees from nearby 30 villages are participating. On festival days ear piercing and tonsuring are done by the devotees in fulfilment of vows. Goat and other animal sacrifices are also done. Women in large light lamps in the temple. They cook rice and offer them to the deity. The devotees would keep the seeds in a pot and come in large numbers as a mark of expressing the prosperity. They would carry the pot  containing fire. The speciality of the temple is that woman devotees, would have coconut and bananas in a box made of leaves and worship the deity. This is called pettippazham, keeping the fruit in a box and offering.

Cultivation
The lake, in 500 acre area, was not filled fully for nearly five years and local people affected for some time. People are expecting that if the water is filled fully in the lake it would help them for their paddy cultivation and other activities.

References

External links
 Nalli Singamadai Ayyanar Kovil, Nalli
 நல்லி ஸ்ரீ பதினெட்டாம்படி கருப்பசாமி
 Nalli singamudaya ayyanar sivarathiri poojai
 நள்ளி சிங்கமடை அய்யனார் கோவில் திருவிழா
 நள்ளி சிங்கமடை அய்யனார் கேவிலில் முளைப்பாரி கும்மி
 Nalli Sri Singamudai Ayyanar Temple

Hindu temples in Virudhunagar district